This is a list of what are intended to be the notable top hotels by country, five or four star hotels, notable skyscraper landmarks or historic hotels which are covered in multiple reliable publications.

Abkhazia
Hotel Abkhazia Sokhumi, Sukhumi
Hotel Ritsa, Sukhumi
Medea Hotel, Sukhumi

Afghanistan

Hotel Inter-Continental Kabul, Kabul
Kabul Serena Hotel, Kabul
Mazar Hotel, Mazar-e-Sharif
Safi Landmark Hotel, Kabul

Albania
Adriatik Hotel, Durrës
 Tirana International Hotel, Tirana

Algeria
El-Djazair, Algiers
Hilton Alger, Algiers
Hotel Cirta, Annaba
Royal Hotel, Oran
Sheraton Oran Hotel and Towers, Oran
Grand Hotel Cirta, Constantine
Constantine Marriott Hotel, Constantine

American Samoa
Rainmaker Hotel, Pago Pago
Tradewinds Hotel, Fagatogo

Andorra

Angola
Hotel Presidente Luanda, Luanda

Anguilla
Cap Juluca Hotel, Cap Juluca
Carimar Beach Club, Mead's Bay, The Valley
CuisinArt Resort and Spa, Rendezvous Beach

Antigua and Barbuda
Lashings, Runaway Bay

Argentina
Alvear Palace Hotel, Buenos Aires
Hilton Buenos Aires, Buenos Aires
Marriott Plaza Hotel, Buenos Aires, Buenos Aires
Sofitel Buenos Aires, Buenos Aires

Armenia

Grand Hotel Yerevan, Yerevan
Armenia Marriott Hotel, Yerevan
Ani Plaza Hotel, Yerevan
Tsaghkadzor General Sports Complex, Tsaghkadzor, Kotayk
Golden Palace Hotel, Tsaghkadzor, Kotayk
Radisson Blu Hotel, Yerevan

Aruba
Aruba Marriott Resort
Radisson Aruba Resort, Casino & Spa

Australia

Australia Hotel, Sydney
Buchanan's Hotel, Townsville
Crown Perth
Crown Melbourne
Dick's Hotel, Sydney
Grace Hotel, Sydney
Harbour Rocks Hotel, Sydney
Holiday Inn, Townsville, Townsville
Hotel Canberra, Canberra
Hotel Grand Chancellor, Hobart, Hobart
Hotel Grand Chancellor, Launceston, Launceston
Hotel Windsor, Melbourne
Hydro Majestic Hotel, Blackheath
The Langham, Melbourne
Manor Apartment Hotel, Brisbane
Old Canberra Inn, Canberra
The Old Woolstore Apartment Hotel, Hobart
Palace Hotel, Perth
Palazzo Versace Australia, Gold Coast, Queensland
 Raffles Hotel, Perth
The Reef Hotel Casino, Cairns
Regatta Hotel, Brisbane
Sebel Townhouse Hotel, Sydney
Shamrock Hotel, Bendigo
The Star, Sydney
The Star Gold Coast, Gold Coast, Queensland
Victoria Hotel, Darwin
White Bay Hotel, Sydney
Wrest Point Hotel Casino, Hobart

Austria

Grand Hotel, Vienna
Hotel Imperial, Vienna
Hotel Metropole, Vienna
Hotel Sacher, Vienna
Hotel Sacher Salzburg, Salzburg
Schloss Velden, Velden am Wörthersee
Schloss Wilhelminenberg, Vienna

Azerbaijan
JW Marriott Absheron Baku Hotel, Baku
AF Hotel, Novkhani, Baku
Flame Towers, Baku
Full Moon Hotel, Baku
Shaki Caravanserai, Sheki

Azores

Reid's Palace Hotel

References

A